Fantasporto, also known as Fantas, is an international film festival, annually organized since 1981 in Porto, Portugal. Giving screen space to fantasy/science fiction/horror-oriented commercial feature films, auteur films and experimental projects from all over the world, Fantasporto has created enthusiastic audiences, ranging from cinephiles to more popular spectators, with an annual average of 110,000 attendees. It was rated in Variety as one of the 25 leading festivals of the world. In its 27th edition in February 2006 the festival reached 104,000 people and 5,000 media references, both domestic and international, with a record of 187 hours of TV time. Present in Porto were about 100 members of the foreign press and about 250 Portuguese journalists and media representatives.

In spite of being organized by a private entity, the event is mostly state funded, with the Ministry of Culture of Portugal leading and the President of the Republic as head of the Honour Committee, along with several private sponsors.

Awards
Secção Oficial Cinema Fantástico
 Grande Prémio Fantasporto – Best Film Award
 Prémio Especial do Juri – Jury’s Special Award
 Melhor Realização – Best Direction
 Melhor Actor – Best Actor
 Melhor Actriz – Best Actress
 Melhor Argumento – Best Screenplay
 Melhores Efeitos Especiais – Best Special Effects
 Melhor Curta-Metragem – Best Short Film
 Menção do Juri Internacional – Special Mention of the Jury
Semana dos Realizadores
 Prémio Melhor Filme Semana dos Realizadores:  – Directors Week Best Film  Award
 Prémio Especial do Juri – Directors Week Jury’s Special Award
 Melhor Realização – Directors Week Best Director Award
 Melhor Actor – Directors Week Best Actor Award
 Melhor Actriz – Directors Week Best Actress Award
 Melhor Argumento – Directors Week Best Screenplay Award
 Menção Especial – Special Mention of the Directors Week Jury
Prémio do Cinema Português
 Melhor Filme  – Best Portuguese Picture
 Melhor Escola  – Best Portuguese Cinema School
Non official awards
 International Fantasy Film Special Jury Award
 Prémio da Crítica  – Critic’s Award
 Prémio do Público  – Audience Award
 Prémios Carreira

Grande Prémio Fantasporto
The Grande Prémio Fantasporto is the highest prize awarded at the Fantasporto Film Festival and is presented to the director of the best feature film of the official competition.

Award winners

* denotes first win

Multiple award winners

  Vincenzo Natali (1999, 2005)
  Guillermo del Toro (1994, 2007)

Melhor Actor

The Best Actor Award is an award presented at Fantasporto. It is chosen by the jury from the 'official section' of movies at the festival. It was first awarded in 1982.

Award winners

Melhor Atriz

The Best Actress Award is an award presented at Fantasporto. It is chosen by the jury from the 'official section' of movies at the festival. It was first awarded in 1982.

Award winners

Melhor Argumento

The Best Screenplay Award is an award presented at Fantasporto. It is chosen by the jury from the 'official section' of movies at the festival.

Award winners

See also
 European Fantastic Film Festivals Federation

Other genre film festivals
 Sitges Film Festival
 Fantasia International Film Festival
 Fantastic Fest
 Festival international du film fantastique de Gérardmer
 Screamfest Horror Film Festival
 Brussels International Fantastic Film Festival
 Puchon International Fantastic Film Festival
 Fantafestival

Notes

References

External links
Fantasporto (Portuguese)
Fantasporto (English)

Film festivals in Portugal
Events in Porto
Fantasy and horror film festivals
Annual events in Portugal
Film festivals established in 1981
Recurring events established in 1981
1981 establishments in Portugal
Science fiction film festivals